Anthony Marten (c. 1542 – August 1597) was an English courtier and author during the reign of Queen Elizabeth I.

He was the son of David Marten (senior clerk to the surveyor of the king's works) and his wife Jane Cooke. Anthony Marten was educated at Trinity Hall, Cambridge, but there is no evidence that he graduated. He then entered the royal household. In 1570 he was the Queen's "sewar" and then her steward. From July 1579 to March 1586 he was bailiff of Ledbury, Herefordshire, and in August 1588 the Queen awarded him a lease for a house in Richmond. She also appointed him Keeper of the Royal Library at the Palace of Westminster (an office for life with a salary of 20 marks per annum) and as royal cup bearer the Queen granted him monopoly on exporting tin.

He wrote two tracts around the time of the Spanish Armada, portraying England as the new Israel, with Philip II of Spain as the new Sennacherib.

Works
An exhortation, to stirre up the mindes of all her majestie's faithfull subjects, to defend their countrey (1588).
A second sound, or, Warning of the trumpet unto judgment, wherein is proved that all the tokens of the latter day are not onelie come, but welneere finished (1589).
A Reconciliation of All the Pastors and Cleargy of the Church of England (1590).

Notes

Further reading

W. D. J. Cargill Thompson, ‘Anthony Marten and the Elizabethan debate on episcopacy’, in G. V. Bennett and J. D. Walsh (eds.), Essays in Modern English Church History: in Memory of Norman Sykes (1966), pp. 44–75.
W. D. J. Cargill Thompson, ‘Sir Francis Knollys's campaign against the jure divino theory of episcopacy’, in C. W. Dugmore (ed.), Studies in the Reformation: Luther to Hooker (1980), pp. 94–130, 123–5.

1540s births
1597 deaths
16th-century English writers
16th-century male writers
Court of Elizabeth I
Alumni of Trinity Hall, Cambridge